Fu Jian may refer to:

 Fu Jian (317–355) (苻健, r. 351–355), founding emperor of Former Qin, posthumous name Emperor Jingming
 Fu Jian (337–385) (苻堅, r. 357–385), ruler of Former Qin, posthumous name Emperor Xuanzhao
 An alternate spelling for Fujian

See also

Fujian (disambiguation)
Fuji An (disambiguation)
Jianfu
Jian (disambiguation)
Fu (disambiguation)